The Château de Puilaurens (Puilaurens Castle, also Puylaurens; in Occitan: lo Castèl de Puèg-Laurenç) is one of the so-called Cathar castles in the commune of Lapradelle-Puilaurens in the Aude département. The castle is located above the Boulzane Valley and the villages of Lapradelle and Puilaurens. There is a path from Axat to the castle.

The castle has been listed as a monument historique by the French Ministry of Culture since 1902.

See also

List of castles in France

References

Further reading

External links
 

Castles in Aude
Ruined castles in Occitania (administrative region)
Monuments historiques of Aude
Catharism